The 2015 Pittsburgh Panthers baseball team represents the University of Pittsburgh during the 2015 NCAA Division I baseball season. The Panthers play their home games at Charles L. Cost Field as a member of the Atlantic Coast Conference. They are led by head coach Joe Jordano, in his 18th season at Pittsburgh.

Previous season
In 2014, the Panthers finished the season 6th in the ACC's Coastal Division with a record of 22–30, 11–19 in conference play. They failed to qualify for the 2014 Atlantic Coast Conference baseball tournament or the 2014 NCAA Division I baseball tournament.

Personnel

Roster

Coaching staff

Season

February
The Panthers opened up their season with three games in Port Charlotte, Florida, as part of the annual Snowbird Baseball Classic. In their first game of the three game tournament, Pittsburgh defeated , 18–1. The Billikens were the three-time defending Atlantic 10 Conference regular season champions. Frank Maldonado hit his first career home run in his first career game and T. J. Zeuch struck out nine Billikens in the victory.

Schedule

! style="background:#1C2A43;color:white;"| Regular Season
|- valign="top" 

|- bgcolor="#bbffbb"
| February 13 || vs.  ||  || Charlotte Sports Park • Port Charlotte, FL || 18–1 ||  Zuech (1–0) || Moore (0–1) ||  ||  || 1–0 || –
|- align="center" bgcolor=""
| February 14 || vs. Kansas State ||  || North Charlotte Regional Park • Port Charlotte, FL ||  ||  ||  ||  ||  ||  ||
|- align="center" bgcolor=""
| February 15 || vs.   ||  || North Charlotte Regional Park • Port Charlotte, FL ||  ||  ||  ||  ||  ||  ||
|- align="center" bgcolor=""
| February 20 || at  ||  || Russell C. King Field • Spartanburg, SC ||  ||  ||  ||  ||  ||  ||
|- align="center" bgcolor=""
| February 21 || at  ||  || Harley Park • Spartanburg, SC ||  ||  ||  ||  ||  ||  ||
|- align="center" bgcolor=""
| February 22 || vs.  ||  || Harley Park • Spartanburg, SC ||  ||  ||  ||  ||  ||  ||
|- align="center" bgcolor=""
| February 27 || at VCU ||  || The Diamond • Richmond, VA ||  ||  ||  ||  ||  ||  ||
|- align="center" bgcolor=""
| February 28 || at VCU ||  || The Diamond • Richmond, VA ||  ||  ||  ||  ||  ||  ||
|-

|- align="center" bgcolor=""
| March 1 || at VCU ||  || The Diamond • Richmond, VA ||  ||  ||  ||  ||  ||  ||
|- align="center" bgcolor=""
| March 6 || at Virginia ||  || Davenport Field • Charlottesville, VA ||  ||  ||  ||  ||  ||  ||
|- align="center" bgcolor=""
| March 7 || at Virginia ||  || Davenport Field • Charlottesville, VA ||  ||  ||  ||  ||  ||  ||
|- align="center" bgcolor=""
| March 8 || at Virginia ||  || Davenport Field • Charlottesville, VA ||  ||  ||  ||  ||  ||  ||
|- align="center" bgcolor=""
| March 10 ||  ||  || Charles L. Cost Field • Pittsburgh, PA ||  ||  ||  ||  ||  ||  ||
|- align="center" bgcolor=""
| March 10 || Niagara ||  || Charles L. Cost Field • Pittsburgh, PA ||  ||  ||  ||  ||  ||  ||
|- align="center" bgcolor=""
| March 11 || Niagara ||  || Charles L. Cost Field • Pittsburgh, PA ||  ||  ||  ||  ||  ||  ||
|- align="center" bgcolor=""
| March 13 ||  ||  || Charles L. Cost Field • Pittsburgh, PA ||  ||  ||  ||  ||  ||  ||
|- align="center" bgcolor=""
| March 14 || North Carolina ||  || Charles L. Cost Field • Pittsburgh, PA ||  ||  ||  ||  ||  ||  ||
|- align="center" bgcolor=""
| March 15 || North Carolina ||  || Charles L. Cost Field • Pittsburgh, PA ||  ||  ||  ||  ||  ||  ||
|- align="center" bgcolor=""
| March 17 ||  ||  || Charles L. Cost Field • Pittsburgh, PA ||  ||  ||  ||  ||  ||  ||
|- align="center" bgcolor=""
| March 18 ||  ||  || Charles L. Cost Field • Pittsburgh, PA ||  ||  ||  ||  ||  ||  ||
|- align="center" bgcolor=""
| March 20 || at Duke ||  || Durham Bulls Athletic Park • Durham, NC ||  ||  ||  ||  ||  ||  ||
|- align="center" bgcolor=""
| March 21 || at Duke ||  || Durham Bulls Athletic Park • Durham, NC ||  ||  ||  ||  ||  ||  ||
|- align="center" bgcolor=""
| March 22 || at Duke ||  || Durham Bulls Athletic Park • Durham, NC ||  ||  ||  ||  ||  ||  ||
|- align="center" bgcolor=""
| March 25 || at  ||  || Eastwood Field • Niles, OH ||  ||  ||  ||  ||  ||  ||
|- align="center" bgcolor=""
| March 27 || at NC State ||  || Doak Field • Raleigh, NC ||  ||  ||  ||  ||  ||  ||
|- align="center" bgcolor=""
| March 28 || at NC State ||  || Doak Field • Raleigh, NC ||  ||  ||  ||  ||  ||  ||
|- align="center" bgcolor=""
| March 29 || at NC State ||  || Doak Field • Raleigh, NC ||  ||  ||  ||  ||  ||  ||
|- align="center" bgcolor=""
| March 31 || West Virginia ||  || Charles L. Cost Field • Pittsburgh, PA ||  ||  ||  ||  ||  ||  ||
|-

|- align="center" bgcolor=""
| April 3 || Notre Dame ||  || Charles L. Cost Field • Pittsburgh, PA ||  ||  ||  ||  ||  ||  ||
|- align="center" bgcolor=""
| April 4 || Notre Dame ||  || Charles L. Cost Field • Pittsburgh, PA ||  ||  ||  ||  ||  ||  ||
|- align="center" bgcolor=""
| April 5 || Notre Dame ||  || Charles L. Cost Field • Pittsburgh, PA ||  ||  ||  ||  ||  ||  ||
|- align="center" bgcolor=""
| April 7 || at Akron ||  || Lee R. Jackson Baseball Field • Akron, OH ||  ||  ||  ||  ||  ||  ||
|- align="center" bgcolor=""
| April 8 || Youngstown State ||  || Charles L. Cost Field • Pittsburgh, PA ||  ||  ||  ||  ||  ||  ||
|- align="center" bgcolor=""
| April 10 || Wake Forest ||  || Charles L. Cost Field • Pittsburgh, PA ||  ||  ||  ||  ||  ||  ||
|- align="center" bgcolor=""
| April 11 || Wake Forest ||  || Charles L. Cost Field • Pittsburgh, PA ||  ||  ||  ||  ||  ||  ||
|- align="center" bgcolor=""
| April 12 || Wake Forest ||  || Charles L. Cost Field • Pittsburgh, PA ||  ||  ||  ||  ||  ||  ||
|- align="center" bgcolor=""
| April 14 ||  ||  || Charles L. Cost Field • Pittsburgh, PA ||  ||  ||  ||  ||  ||  ||
|- align="center" bgcolor=""
| April 17 || at Florida State ||  || Dick Howser Stadium • Tallahassee, FL ||  ||  ||  ||  ||  ||  ||
|- align="center" bgcolor=""
| April 18 || at Florida State ||  || Dick Howser Stadium • Tallahassee, FL ||  ||  ||  ||  ||  ||  ||
|- align="center" bgcolor=""
| April 19 || at Florida State ||  || Dick Howser Stadium • Tallahassee, FL ||  ||  ||  ||  ||  ||  ||
|- align="center" bgcolor=""
| April 25 ||  ||  || Charles L. Cost Field • Pittsburgh, PA ||  ||  ||  ||  ||  ||  ||
|- align="center" bgcolor=""
| April 25 || Fairfield ||  || Charles L. Cost Field • Pittsburgh, PA ||  ||  ||  ||  ||  ||  ||
|- align="center" bgcolor=""
| April 26 || Fairfield ||  || Charles L. Cost Field • Pittsburgh, PA ||  ||  ||  ||  ||  ||  ||
|- align="center" bgcolor=""
| April 29 || at Penn State ||  || Medlar Field • University Park, PA ||  ||  ||  ||  ||  ||  ||
|-

|- align="center" bgcolor=""
| May 2 || Miami (FL) ||  || Charles L. Cost Field • Pittsburgh, PA ||  ||  ||  ||  ||  ||  ||
|- align="center" bgcolor=""
| May 2 || Miami (FL) ||  || Charles L. Cost Field • Pittsburgh, PA ||  ||  ||  ||  ||  ||  ||
|- align="center" bgcolor=""
| May 3 || Miami (FL) ||  || Charles L. Cost Field • Pittsburgh, PA ||  ||  ||  ||  ||  ||  ||
|- align="center" bgcolor=""
| May 8 || at Georgia Tech ||  || Russ Chandler Stadium • Atlanta, GA ||  ||  ||  ||  ||  ||  ||
|- align="center" bgcolor=""
| May 9 || at Georgia Tech ||  || Russ Chandler Stadium • Atlanta, GA ||  ||  ||  ||  ||  ||  ||
|- align="center" bgcolor=""
| May 10 || at Georgia Tech ||  || Russ Chandler Stadium • Atlanta, GA ||  ||  ||  ||  ||  ||  ||
|- align="center" bgcolor=""
| May 12 || at West Virginia ||  || Monongalia County Ballpark • Granville, WV ||  ||  ||  ||  ||  ||  ||
|- align="center" bgcolor=""
| May 15 || Virginia Tech ||  || Charles L. Cost Field • Pittsburgh, PA ||  ||  ||  ||  ||  ||  ||
|- align="center" bgcolor=""
| May 16 || Virginia Tech ||  || Charles L. Cost Field • Pittsburgh, PA ||  ||  ||  ||  ||  ||  ||
|- align="center" bgcolor=""
| May 17 || Virginia Tech ||  || Charles L. Cost Field • Pittsburgh, PA ||  ||  ||  ||  ||  ||  ||
|-

|- 
! style="background:#1C2A43;color:white;"| Post-Season
|-

|- align="center"
| May 19 || TBD || || Durham Bulls Athletic Park • Durham, NC ||  ||  ||  ||  ||  ||  || 
|-

|-
| style="font-size:88%"| All rankings from Collegiate Baseball.

References

Pittsburgh Panthers
Pittsburgh Panthers baseball seasons